Dustin Dobravsky (born 21 November 1991) is a German born Canadian rugby union player who plays as a flanker  or No8 representing Canada internationally. On 9 October 2019, he was called up to the Canadian squad for the 2019 Rugby World Cup as an injury replacement to Mike Sheppard.

References

1991 births
Rugby union flankers
Living people
BC Bears players
University of Victoria alumni
Rugby union number eights
German expatriate sportspeople in Canada
Canadian expatriate sportspeople in Germany
German people of Canadian descent